Muses Mills is an unincorporated community in Fleming County, Kentucky, United States. Muses Mills has a post office with ZIP code 41065.

References

Unincorporated communities in Fleming County, Kentucky
Unincorporated communities in Kentucky